The 1956 United States presidential election in Florida was held on November 6, 1956, as part of the concurrent United States presidential election. Florida voters chose ten electors, or representatives to the Electoral College, who voted for president and vice president.

Background
Except for the 1928 election when fierce anti-Catholicism and Prohibitionism caused Herbert Hoover to defeat the wet Catholic Al Smith, Florida since the end of Reconstruction had been a classic Southern one-party state dominated by the Democratic Party. Disfranchisement of African-Americans and many poor whites had virtually eliminated the Republican Party – only nine Republicans were ever elected to the state legislature between 1890 and 1950 – while Democratic primaries were the sole competitive elections.

Under the influence of Senator Claude Pepper, Florida abolished the poll tax in 1937, leading to steady increases in voter turnout during the following several elections; however, there was no marked increase in African-American voting and Democratic hegemony remained unchallenged: FDR did not lose a single county in the state during his four elections.

However, the following two elections would see a rapid trend away from Democratic hegemony towards Republican dominance in newer, more liberal South Florida. The regions shifting rapidly towards the GOP in these two elections lacked a history of slave-based plantation farming, and saw Eisenhower as more favourable to business than the Democratic Party. They also had seen a very large inflow of elderly migrants from the Northern states who were attracted by Florida's hot climate. An example of this is Collier County in southwest Florida, home to the city of Naples, which went Republican for the first time since the county's founding in 1923 and has never voted Democratic since. Consequently, Eisenhower was able to carry the Sunshine State by a double-digit margin in 1952, in spite of losing badly in the "Hoovercrat" pineywoods and Black Belt of the Panhandle.

Vote
The 1956 election saw, in general, little change from trends established during the previous two elections, with the most significant exception being a marked (though temporary) trend towards Eisenhower amongst the small but increasing number of Negro voters in the state. Eisenhower, aided further by increased Northerner migration, won against his rematch opponent Adlai Stevenson II by 163,474 votes or 14.54%. This result nonetheless made Florida about 0.86% more Democratic than the nation-at-large. This was the first time ever that Citrus County voted Republican. As of 2023, this is also the last time that Florida voted to the left of Rhode Island, Maryland, and Massachusetts.

Results

Results by county

Notes

References 

Florida
1956 Florida elections
United States presidential elections in Florida